Road Song is an album by the jazz guitarist Wes Montgomery, released in 1968. It reached number one on the Billboard Jazz album chart and number 39 on the R&B chart. It also reached number 94 on the Billboard 200. It was his final recording before his death of a heart attack on June 15, 1968.

Reception 

In his AllMusic review, Scott Yanow wrote: "The great guitarist sticks to simple melody statements (with a lot of octaves thrown in) while backed by Don Sebesky's unimaginative arrangements for an orchestra; commercially the combination was a big success… this strictly for-the-money effort can be safely passed by."

Track listing 
 "Road Song" (Wes Montgomery) – 3:53
 "Greensleeves" (Public Domain, Traditional) – 2:04
 "Fly Me to the Moon" (Bart Howard) – 2:53
 "Yesterday" (John Lennon, Paul McCartney) – 3:26
 "I'll Be Back" (Lennon, McCartney) – 2:33
 "Scarborough Fair/Canticle" (Paul Simon, Art Garfunkel, Traditional) – 4:55
 "Green Leaves of Summer" (Dimitri Tiomkin, Paul Francis Webster, Montgomery) – 3:58
 "Serene" (Montgomery) – 3:10
 "Where Have All the Flowers Gone?" (Pete Seeger) – 3:06

Personnel 
Musicians
 Wes Montgomery – guitar
 Herbie Hancock – piano
 Richard Davis – bass
 Grady Tate – drums
 Ed Shaughnessy – drums
 Ray Barretto – percussion
 Jack Jennings – percussion
 Bernie Glow – trumpet
 Marvin Stamm – trumpet
 Wayne Andre – trombone
 Paul Faulise – trombone
 Donald Ashworth – flute, clarinet, oboe, recorder, English horn
 James Buffington – French horn
 Harvey Estrin – flute, recorder
 Stan Webb – flute, clarinet, oboe, recorder
 George Marge – flute, clarinet, oboe
 Don Hammond – flute, recorder
 Hank Jones – harpsichord, piano
 Walter Kane – bassoon
 Bernard Krainis – recorder
 Eric Leber – harpsichord, recorder
 Bernard Eichen – violin
 Charles Libove – violin
 Tosha Samaroff – violin
 Charles McCracken – cello
 George Ricci – cello
 Alan Shulman – cello
 Emanuel Vardi – viola

Production
 Creed Taylor – producer
 Don Sebesky – arranger, conductor
 Rudy Van Gelder – engineer
 Pete Turner – cover photo, photography
 Sam Antupit – design

Chart positions

References

1968 albums
Wes Montgomery albums
Albums produced by Creed Taylor
A&M Records albums
Albums recorded at Van Gelder Studio
Albums conducted by Don Sebesky
Albums arranged by Don Sebesky